The 2010–11 Fulham season was the club's 113th professional season and its tenth consecutive season in the top flight of English football, the Premier League. The season commenced on 14 August 2010 and concluded on 22 May 2011 after 38 league matches. Due to its 12th-placed finish in the league the previous season and defeat in the Europa League Final, Fulham did not qualify for European competition. In addition to the Premier League, the club entered the Football League Cup in the second round, and the FA Cup in the third round.

Manager Roy Hodgson left the club during the summer after three seasons to replace Rafael Benítez at Liverpool. On 29 July, Fulham confirmed former Manchester City, Blackburn Rovers and Wales national team coach Mark Hughes as its new manager.

Despite drawing 16 games in the Premier League, it was a successful season for Hughes and Fulham as the club finished eighth, the second-highest position in the club's history. Fulham were eliminated from the Football League Cup in the third round, but progressed to the fifth round of the FA Cup before exiting the competition. Clint Dempsey finished as the club's overall top scorer for the season, with 13 goals in all competitions. Fulham qualified for the following season's UEFA Europa League after finishing as one of the top teams in the UEFA Fair Play rankings.

Pre-season and friendlies

Matches
Fulham initially arranged three pre-season friendlies, away to Brentford (14 July) and AFC Bournemouth (17 July), and at home against German side Werder Bremen on 7 August. The club announced a further friendly against Portsmouth, as a testimonial match for former Portsmouth defender Linvoy Primus, who had been forced to retire due to injury. The match was played on 31 July. Fulham also organised a ten-day tour to Sweden, with friendlies fixtures against Halmstads BK on 22 July and Malmö FF on 27 July.

The first team squad returned to training on 6 July, with the exception of Mark Schwarzer, John Pantsil, Clint Dempsey, Kagisho Dikgacoi, Dickson Etuhu and Philippe Senderos who had been competing in the 2010 FIFA World Cup in South Africa. The first pre-season fixture against Brentford ended in a 5–0 victory, with Chris Baird, David Elm, Damien Duff, Eddie Johnson and Simon Davies all getting on the scoresheet, while Brentford's Charlie MacDonald missed a penalty that would have brought Brentford level at 1–1. The second match against AFC Bournemouth was played three days later at Dean Court. Fulham striker Bobby Zamora scored an equaliser after Anton Robinson's opening goal to secure a 1–1 draw. The squad then travelled to Sweden, where they faced Halmstads BK and Malmö FF. Zoltán Gera scored twice against Halmstad in a 2–2 draw as Fulham came from 2–1 behind to draw the match. Gera put Fulham ahead in the eighth minute but Joe Sise turned the game around with two goals (24 and 26) before Gera scored again in the 58th minute. The match against Malmö ended in a 0–0 draw.

Fulham's final two pre-season matches were back in England. Hughes watched from the stands as Fulham lost 1–0 to Portsmouth who had been relegated to the Championship, with Marc Wilson scoring the only goal of the match. The club then welcomed German side Werder Bremen to Craven Cottage. Gera scored a hat-trick and Zamora and Johnson both scored in a 5–1 victory; Claudio Pizarro scored the goal for the away side.

Transfers
After the departure of Chris Smalling to Manchester United, fellow defender Philippe Senderos was Fulham's first signing of the summer when he moved from Arsenal on a free transfer. Nicky Shorey and Stefano Okaka both returned to Aston Villa and Roma respectively at the end of their loan deals, while Wayne Brown was released. Erik Nevland, Toni Kallio, Christopher Buchtmann, Michael Uwezu, Andranik Teymourian and Stefan Payne all left the club at the beginning of July. Jonathan Greening committed his future to Fulham by completing a permanent transfer from West Bromwich Albion after a season-long loan.

Fulham made further signings following the start of the Premier League season. Mousa Dembélé moved in a £5 million deal from Dutch side AZ. Algerian defender Rafik Halliche signed for the club on 24 August from Benfica for an undisclosed fee. Three days later, Fulham secured a deal to bring Mexican defender Carlos Salcido to the club for £1.5 million. On transfer deadline day, defender Paul Konchesky departed to Liverpool, with two young players – Lauri Dalla Valle and Alex Kačaniklić – joining Fulham as part of the deal.

Managerial change
Following Roy Hodgson's decision to replace Rafael Benítez as the manager of Liverpool, Sven-Göran Eriksson, Bob Bradley, Alan Curbishley and Ottmar Hitzfeld – the managers of the Ivory Coast national team, United States national team and Switzerland national team respectively – were all strongly linked to the job, but Ajax coach Martin Jol emerged as the favourite for the post. After Jol chose to stay with Ajax and Bradley renewed his contract with the United States, Fulham appointed Mark Hughes as its new manager; he was presented to the press on 3 August.

Kit
On 24 May 2010, Fulham signed a three-year deal with Kappa after having three seasons with Nike. The shirt sponsor was FxPro. The home kit is white and black, the away kit is red and grey and the third kit is green and gold (the same colours as Harrods which Mohammed Al Fayed used to own).

Designer – Kappa
Sponsor – FxPro

Premier League
The Premier League started on 14 August 2010. The provisional fixture list was announced on 17 June 2010, with Fulham starting the season with a match against Bolton Wanderers at the Reebok Stadium. The first match of the season was an even contest that ended 0–0, with Fulham goalkeeper David Stockdale turning in a good performance while deputising for Mark Schwarzer. Fulham then faced Manchester United at Craven Cottage in the first home match of the season. Paul Scholes gave the away side the lead in the 11th minute. Midfielder Simon Davies scored the equaliser and Fulham's first goal of the season after 57 minutes. The game turned in both directions in the final ten minutes: defender Brede Hangeland scored an own goal in the 84th minute, only to redeem himself five minutes later by scoring at the other end of the pitch to equalise for Fulham and earn a 2–2 draw. Nani also had a penalty kick, given for a handball by Damien Duff, saved by Stockdale which would have made the scoreline 3–1 to the away team.

Fulham next played against Premier League newcomers Blackpool at Bloomfield Road, the first top league match at the stadium for 39 years. Fulham's Bobby Zamora opened the scoring in the 35th minute and the score remained at 1–0 until the 71st minute when John Paintsil scored an own goal in Blackpool's favour. Luke Varney then put Blackpool in front at 2–1, but Dickson Etuhu scored again for Fulham (87), securing their third successive league draw.

Pld = Matches played; W = Matches won; D = Matches drawn; L = Matches lost; F = Goals for; A = Goals against; GD = Goal difference; Pts = Points

Results summary

FA Cup
Fulham were drawn against Peterborough United at home in the 3rd round of the FA Cup on 28 November 2010.

Last updated: 20 February 2011Source: Fulham F.C.

Football League Cup
As a Premier League side not competing in European competition, Fulham entered the Football League Cup at the second round stage. The draw was made following the conclusion of the first round ties and saw Fulham facing a home match against Port Vale from League Two. Zoltan Gera and Bobby Zamora both scored twice and Clint Dempsey and new signing Mousa Dembélé also scored in a 6–0 victory. Gera gave Fulham the lead after 10 minutes; Dembélé doubled the advantage (26), Zamora scored a third goal in the 36th minute. Gera (47) and Zamora (66) both scored after half-time and Dempsey added a sixth goal in the 70th minute to round off the victory.

In the draw for the third round, Fulham were handed a meeting against fellow Premier League team Stoke City at the Britannia Stadium on 21 September 2010. Fulham lost this game 2–0 which ended their 2010/2011 Carling Cup campaign.

Last updated: 21 September 2010Source: Fulham F.C.

Statistics

Appearances and Goals
This is a list of the First Team players for the 2010–11 season. Kagisho Dikgacoi was given the number 26 shirt, previously worn by Chris Smalling, while Carlos Salcido was given the number 3 shirt after the departure of Paul Konchesky. Eiður Guðjohnsen took Fredrik Stoor's number 22 shirt during his loan spell. All the new players filled in a few gaps in the squad.

All Premier League clubs had to declare a squad of 25 players on 1 September 2010, who they could choose from until the transfer window re-opened in January 2011. The squad had to include at least eight senior "homegrown" players, defined as having spent three years in an English football academy before the age of 21. Fulham had 11 senior homegrown players in the official list released by the Premier League, with a further group of contracted players under 21 also available for selection.

|-
|colspan="12"|Players who are no longer playing for Fulham or who have been loaned out in the January transfer window:

|}

Top scorers
Includes all competitive matches. The list is sorted by shirt number when total goals are equal.

Last updated on 22 May 2011

Disciplinary record
Includes all competitive matches. Players with 1 card or more included only.

Last updated on 22 May 2011

Transfers

In

Out

Loan out

References

External links
Fulham F.C. official website

2010–11 Premier League by team
2010-11
Fulham Fc Season, 2010-11
Fulham Fc Season, 2010-11